Xubida lipan is a moth in the family Crambidae. It was described by Alexander Barrett Klots in 1970. It has been recorded from the US state of Texas.

References

Haimbachiini
Moths described in 1970